Lu'an, is a prefecture-level city in western Anhui province, People's Republic of China, bordering Henan to the northwest and Hubei to the southwest. As of the 2020 census, it had a total population of 4,393,699 inhabitants whom 1,752,537 lived in the built-up (or metro) area made of Yu'an and Jin'an urban districts. Neighbouring prefecture-level cities are the provincial capital of Hefei to the east, Anqing to the south, Huanggang (Hubei) and Xinyang (Henan) to the west, and Huainan and Fuyang to the north. Although the character  (literally: "six") is normally pronounced "Liù", in this case it changes to "Lù" on account of the historical literary reading.

Geography and climate

Lu'an is marked by the southern fringes of the North China Plain in its north and the northern part of the Dabie Mountains in its south. Its administrative area spans 31°01′−32°40′ N latitude and 115°20′−117°14′ E longitude, respectively.

Lu'an has a monsoon-influenced, humid subtropical climate (Köppen Cfa), with four distinct seasons. Annual sunshine duration is 2,000 to 2,300 hours.

Administration
The prefecture-level city of Lu'an administers seven county-level divisions, including three districts and four counties.

These are further divided into 142 township-level divisions.

Transport
China National Highway 312
Lu'an railway station

References

External links

Government website of Lu'an

 
Cities in Anhui
Prefecture-level divisions of Anhui